Mark Woodhouse (born January 10, 1967) was a Zimbabwean cricketer. He was a right-handed batsman and a right-arm medium-pace bowler who played for Mashonaland Country Districts. He was born in Salisbury (now Harare).

Woodhouse made a single first-class appearance for the team, in the 1994/95 season, against Mashonaland Under-24s. Mashonaland made 14 runs in the only innings in which he batted, and made 0-24 with the ball in the innings in which he bowled.

Woodhouse was a lower-order batsman.

Clubs: Harare Sports Club, Alexandra Sports Club, Enterprise Country Club, Craneleigh Cricket Club

External links
Mark Woodhouse at CricketArchive 

1967 births
Living people
Zimbabwean cricketers